Bay Creek may refer to:

Bay Creek (Eleven Point River tributary), a stream in Arkansas and Missouri
Bay Creek (South Fork Spring River tributary), a stream in Arkansas and Missouri
Bay Creek (Warm Fork Spring River tributary), a stream Missouri
 A neighborhood in Madison, Wisconsin